Michael Paul Cathers (born May 12, 1964), aka Geechy Guy, is an American stand-up comedian.

Early life
Geechy Guy was born in Rochester, Michigan. He began his career as a magician at age 6, followed by juggling and unicycling until taking up comedy at age 19. Guy began his career in the Detroit market, working comedy clubs and appearing on local comedy talk shows, such as "Some Semblance of Sanity" with comedian Gary Thison. Guy and Thison have reunited and are working on a number of comedy projects.

Career
He was a contestant on Star Search during the 1990-1991 season; he defeated, among others, Ray Romano in the competition.  On January 7, 2011, he appeared on The Late Late Show with Craig Ferguson. Previously, he had appeared three times on The Tonight Show with Jay Leno. Guy made his most recent appearance on television as a contestant on the sixth season of America's Got Talent. He reached the top 48 and was X'ed by Piers Morgan. Geechy Guy was then eliminated from the show. He was the opening act on Ron White's Comedy Salute to the Troops 2014, initially aired March 14 of that year. He also appeared at the 2011 NASCAR Newlyweds trivia game during Champions week for a brief act before the drivers arrived.

Guinness World Records
He holds a Guinness World Record for most jokes told in an hour, at 676.

References

1964 births
Living people
American stand-up comedians
America's Got Talent contestants
People from Rochester, Michigan
21st-century American comedians